Mercedes Clementina Marta del Carmen Pardo Ponte, known as Mercedes Pardo (July 29, 1921 – March 24, 2005) was a Venezuelan abstract art painter.

Biography 
Pardo was born July 29, 1921 (or July 20, 1921, according to her obituary in El Pais) in  Caracas, Venezuela. By age 13 she began taking free classes at the Academia de Bellas Artes.

In 1941 she joined the Escuela de Artes Plásticas y Aplicadas in Caracas. She was active in painting, printmaking, and collage, and in 1991 the National Art Gallery in Caracas held an exhibition to review her work from 1941 to 1991.

In 1945 she married Marco Bonta, a professor of stained glass and mural painting. Their marriage was short.

In 1947 she attended the Academy of Fine Arts of Santiago in Chile where she had her first one-woman show. In 1949 she moved to Paris and attended the École du Louvre.

In 1951 she married the painter Alejandro Otero.

She died on March 24, 2005 in San Antonio de Los Altos, Venezuela.

Legacy
The Fundación Alejandro Otero-Mercedes Pardo was established in 2016. It is located at Alejandro Otero and Mercedes Pardo's house in San Antonio de Los Altos.

Exhibitions 
 1947 Pacific Room, Santiago de Chile 
 1962 MBA 
 1964 "Signs", Sala Mendoza 
 1967 "Signs", Librería Cruz del Sur, Caracas 
 1969 "1 x 9 color of silkscreen", MBA 
 1970 "Recent works of Mercedes Pardo", Sala Mendoza 
 1971 Center of Fine Arts, Maracaibo 
 1974 Aele Gallery, Madrid 
 1977 Adler Gallery / Castillo, Caracas / El Parque Art Center, Valencia, Edo.  Carabobo / Pecanins Gallery, Mexico City 
 1978 "From the workshop of Mercedes Pardo today, National Art Gallery", Caracas / Museum of Modern Art, Mexico City 
 1979 "Color, skin, meditated presence: anthological exhibition by Mercedes Pardo", GAN / Galería Adler / Castillo, Caracas 
 1980 "Mercedes Pardo in Margarita: paintings / serigraphs", Museo Francisco Narváez 
 1983 "Inesauribile Venezia", Sagitario Gallery, Caracas 
 1991 "Moradas del color", GAN 
 1993 "Graphic work of Mercedes Pardo", Consulate of Venezuela, New York 
 1994 "Graphic work of Mercedes Pardo", The Warm Spaces 
 1995 "Graphic work of Mercedes Pardo", MRE 
 1996 Sacred Museum, Caracas 
 2000 "Mercedes Pardo, 1951–2000", MAO / "Color and shape", GAN 
 2005 House of the Culture Village of the Sea, Porlamar, Edo.  Nueva Esparta / Unimet

Awards 
 1942 Honorable mention in painting, III Official Salon 
 1944 José Loreto Arismendi Prize, V Official Show 
 1960 Puebla de Bolívar Prize, XXI Official Salon 
 1961 Prize of the Fina Gómez Foundation, XXII Official Show 
 1964 National Prize for Applied Arts (shared with Alejandro Otero), XXV Salón Oficial 
 1966 Enamel Prize, International Exhibition of Artistic Crafts, Stuttgart, Germany 
 1978 National Prize of Plastic Arts, Caracas 
 1980 Special Edition Purchase Award, World Print III, San Francisco, California, United States 
 1991 Armando Reverón Award, AVAP

References

Further reading
 

 image of COMPOSICIÓN

1921 births
2005 deaths
Venezuelan women painters
20th-century Venezuelan painters
20th-century women artists
Venezuelan contemporary artists
Venezuelan expatriates in France